Bossekop Ungdomslag is a Norwegian sports club from Bossekop, Alta, Finnmark. It has sections for association football, team handball, speed skating and Nordic skiing.

It was founded on 25 July 1912 as a youth association.  A sports team within Bossekop UL (cf IL i BUL) was founded in 1958.  The club practiced athletics from 1960, speed skating from 1961, football from 1967, handball from 1973, skiing since 1980 and biathlon since 1991. Some sections later became defunct.

The men's football team plays in the 2. divisjon, the third tier of Norwegian football, after promotion in 2012. The team also played in the Second Division in 2000, 2003 and 2009. The two latter promotions were achieved through playoffs in 2002 and 2008; the club also lost one playoff (to Lyngen/Karnes IL) in 2004. The club has sent players to the Sápmi football team.

The club has had internationally known speed skaters, including Asle T. Johansen and Jarle Pedersen.

Recent history
{|class="wikitable"
|-bgcolor="#efefef"
! Season
!
! Pos.
! Pl.
! W
! D
! L
! GS
! GA
! P
!Cup
!Notes
|-
|2000
|2. divisjon
|align=right bgcolor="#FFCCCC"| 12
|align=right|22||align=right|0||align=right|3||align=right|19
|align=right|31||align=right|95||align=right|3
|First qualifying round
|Relegated to the 3. divisjon
|-
|2001
|3. divisjon
|align=right |3
|align=right|20||align=right|13||align=right|2||align=right|5
|align=right|67||align=right|24||align=right|41
|First round
|
|-
|2002
|3. divisjon
|align=right bgcolor=#DDFFDD| 1
|align=right|22||align=right|18||align=right|1||align=right|3
|align=right|77||align=right|16||align=right|55
|Second qualifying round
|Promoted to the 2. divisjon
|-
|2003
|2. divisjon
|align=right bgcolor="#FFCCCC"| 13
|align=right|26||align=right|8||align=right|2||align=right|16
|align=right|33||align=right|57||align=right|26
|First round
|Relegated to the 3. divisjon
|-
|2004
|3. divisjon
|align=right |1
|align=right|22||align=right|18||align=right|1||align=right|3
|align=right|128||align=right|23||align=right|55
|First round
|
|-
|2005
|3. divisjon
|align=right |2
|align=right|22||align=right|16||align=right|4||align=right|2
|align=right|105||align=right|26||align=right|52
|First round
|
|-
|2006
|3. divisjon
|align=right |5
|align=right|22||align=right|13||align=right|2||align=right|7
|align=right|66||align=right|42||align=right|41
|First qualifying round
|
|-
|2007
|3. divisjon
|align=right |2
|align=right|22||align=right|18||align=right|2||align=right|2
|align=right|107||align=right|18||align=right|56
|First round
|
|-
|2008
|3. divisjon
|align=right bgcolor=#DDFFDD| 1
|align=right|22||align=right|21||align=right|0||align=right|1
|align=right|103||align=right|16||align=right|63
|First round
|Promoted to the 2. divisjon
|-
|2009
|2. divisjon
|align=right bgcolor="#FFCCCC"| 14
|align=right|26||align=right|1||align=right|5||align=right|20
|align=right|29||align=right|84||align=right|8
|First round
|Relegated to the 3. divisjon	
|-
|2010
|3. divisjon
|align=right |2
|align=right|22||align=right|15||align=right|5||align=right|2
|align=right|81||align=right|17||align=right|47
|First qualifying round
|
|-
|2011
|3. divisjon
|align=right |4
|align=right|22||align=right|12||align=right|2||align=right|8
|align=right|67||align=right|41||align=right|38
|First qualifying round
|
|-
|2012
|3. divisjon
|align=right bgcolor=#DDFFDD| 1
|align=right|22||align=right|19||align=right|3||align=right|0
|align=right|77||align=right|19||align=right|60
|First qualifying round
|Promoted to the 2. divisjon
|-
|2013
|2. divisjon
|align=right bgcolor="#FFCCCC"| 14
|align=right|26||align=right|4||align=right|5||align=right|17
|align=right|28||align=right|51||align=right|17
|First round
|Relegated to the 3. divisjon	
|}

References

Official site 

Football clubs in Norway
Association football clubs established in 1912
Sport in Finnmark
Alta, Norway
Defunct athletics clubs in Norway
Speed skating clubs in Norway
1912 establishments in Norway